Gordon Johndroe (born October 25, 1974) is the Managing Director of Communications at American Airlines, a role he assumed in July 2022. In his role at the world’s largest airline, Gordon leads all operational communication teams worldwide, including government and labor communications. As the primary spokesman for the airline, he is responsible for day-to-day media relations globally.

Prior to joining American Airlines, Gordon served as Vice President of Global Media Relations and Public Affairs at The Boeing Company until 2021. He joined Boeing in November 2014 to lead communications strategies associated with advocacy for the company's products and businesses, as well as issues management and outreach to the Washington, D.C. news media and related constituencies. Johndroe was promoted several times at Boeing and eventually took over global communications leadership in 2020. Johndroe previously worked at Lockheed Martin from 2013-2014 as Vice President for Worldwide Media Relations. He served as chief spokesperson for the corporation, counseled senior leaders on media engagements and oversaw Lockheed Martin’s media relations campaigns and strategies. 

Prior to joining Lockheed Martin, he served as Deputy Assistant to President George W. Bush, Deputy Press Secretary and a spokesman for the United States National Security Council. Johndroe previously served as Director of Strategic Communications and Planning at the State Department, Press Secretary to the First Lady and as the Press Secretary for the Department of Homeland Security. Johndroe also served as an Assistant Press Secretary and as a spokesman at The White House beginning from January 2001 until the creation of the Department of Homeland Security two years later in January 2003. Gordon was traveling with President Bush on September 11, 2001. He worked on then-Governor Bush's Presidential campaign of 2000 as well as Bush's 1998 Texas gubernatorial re-election.

Background
Gordon Johndroe is a native of Fort Worth, Texas and attended the University of Texas at Austin.  Gordon Johndroe worked on the Bush campaign in 2000 and served in the Bush administration for all eight years, ending his tenure as spokesman for the United States National Security Council.

References

External links
White House Personnel Announcement, October 2006
White House Biography
Boeing Biography

1974 births
Assistants to the President of the United States
Living people
People from Fort Worth, Texas
University of Texas at Austin alumni